Marzenna Stefania Drab (born 20 February 1956 in Grudziądz) is a Polish politician who is a member of the Sejm of Poland (since 2007) and former acting Governor of Kuyavian-Pomeranian Voivodeship (2006).

She graduated Nicolaus Copernicus University in Toruń. She worked in Polish Army, Grudziądz City Office and bank PKO BP. Between 1992 and 2004 she worked in Public Work Office and in City Office again as Secretary of Grudziądz City.

On 27 January 2006 she was nominated as Vice-Governor of Kuyavian-Pomeranian Voivodeship in Kazimierz Marcinkiewicz Cabinet. Between 24 July and 7 November 2006 she was an Acting Governor.

On 21 October 2007, in parliamentary election, she joined the Sejm of Poland VI term (the lower house of the Polish parliament). She polled 7,396 votes and was fourth on the Law and Justice list. Her term was started on 5 November 2007.

See also 
 List of Sejm members (2007–2011)
 Kuyavian-Pomeranian Voivodeship

References

External links 
 (pl) Official webside
 (pl) Sejm VI term webside

1956 births
Living people
People from Grudziądz
Nicolaus Copernicus University in Toruń alumni
Members of the Polish Sejm 2007–2011
Voivodes of Kuyavian-Pomeranian Voivodeship